Șelaru is a commune in Dâmbovița County, Muntenia, Romania with a population of 3,494 people. It is composed of three villages: Fierbinți, Glogoveanu and Șelaru.

References

Communes in Dâmbovița County
Localities in Muntenia